Horgen railway station is a railway station in Switzerland, situated on the banks of Lake Zürich in the town of Horgen. The station is located on the Lake Zürich left bank railway line and is served by lines S2 and S8 of the Zürich S-Bahn.

The station provides an integrated transfer facility with the buses of the Zimmerberg bus line, which operate from a bus station immediately adjacent to the railway station.

Horgen station should not be confused with the nearby, but higher level, Horgen Oberdorf railway station, which is on the Thalwil–Arth-Goldau railway.

Gallery

References

External links 
 
 

Railway stations in the canton of Zürich
Swiss Federal Railways stations
Horgen